Parás is a rural municipal town in the state of Nuevo León, Mexico, founded on February 17, 1851. It lies southwest of the Falcón Reservoir in Tamaulipas. It was founded in what was known as Rancho Huizachal de los Canales. The name Parás is derived from Jose María Parás y Ballesteros, the first constitutional governor of Nuevo León. Prior to the settlement the land was Gualeno Indian Tribe Territory and left many artifact the biggest being Piedras Pintas just a few miles northwest of the town. The town is small in size but it has many smaller settlements and ranches under municipality jurisdiction. The people of Parás live of ranching and agriculture. The population is not large at all due to the number of people who fleeted throughout the years to the U.S. seeking employment. The town is usually at its fullest of capacity during American holidays when its residents go back home. It is well known for the increasing amount of whitetail deer, bringing in hunters from all over. It is also known for its local festivities, the biggest being on the following Saturday of its anniversary February 17. The town celebrates by making a "cabalgata" a horse trail ride from its neighboring town Agualeguas back to the town. The festival has many of the town's traditional dishes example: Pansaje, cabrito en sangre, dulce de frijol, tamales de venado, milk candies, sweet bread, etc. Then at night the day comes to an end with a dance at the Club Femenil in front of the town's plaza with live music Norteno bands like Los Rancheritos del Topo Chico or an Orchestra band like JLB y Cia. The plaza is popular being located in the center of the town surrounded by two churches, the dance hall, food marts, elementary school and the city hall. 

Municipalities of Nuevo León
Populated places in Nuevo León
Populated places established in 1851
1851 establishments in Mexico